London Scottish may refer to:
London Scottish (regiment), a former regiment of the British Territorial Army, now a company of the London Regiment
London Scottish Bank, a British bank
London Scottish F.C., a British rugby union club
London Scottish Golf Club, a British golf club in Wimbledon